Bai Anqi (born 9 January 1993) is a Chinese backstroke swimmer. She competed at the 2012 Summer Olympics, where she did not qualify for the semifinals, after finishing in seventeenth position in the qualifiers, with a time of 2:11:26, the sixth-fastest in her heat of the 200 m backstroke.

Personal life
Bai Anqi was born on 9 January 1993 in Anji, Zhejiang, in the east of the People's Republic of China. Her nickname is "White Angel" as what her name translates to when translated to English. Bai's hobbies include listening to music and going on the internet. The only language she speaks is Chinese, and she is currently a student.

Swimming
Bai is coached by Shi Xiaoming and Xu Guoyi in swimming. She currently swims in the Zhejiang Province Swimming Team, and swims backstroke. She swims in the women's 200m backstroke event in swimming. She did not qualify for the 2012 Summer Olympics held in London, after finishing in nineteenth position in the qualifiers, with a time of 2:11.26. She was three positions away from qualifying for the 200m backstroke event at the London Olympic Games, but, reached the highest position for a Chinese swimmer in the qualifiers of this event. It took her 31.02 seconds to reach the 50 metre mark, 1:04.51 to reach the one hundred metre mark, 1 minute 37.88 seconds to reach the 150 mark, then 2:11:26 to finish the qualifiers. In the qualifying heats, she was sixth position in her heat, but could not qualify. Her reaction time in the qualifying heat was 0.54 seconds.

See also
China at the 2012 Summer Olympics - Swimming

References

External links 
 
 
 

 
 
 

1993 births
Living people
Chinese female backstroke swimmers
Swimmers at the 2012 Summer Olympics
Olympic swimmers of China
Swimmers at the 2010 Summer Youth Olympics
Swimmers from Zhejiang
Swimmers at the 2006 Asian Games
Youth Olympic gold medalists for China
Asian Games competitors for China
20th-century Chinese women
21st-century Chinese women